Heritage interpretation refers to all the ways in which information is communicated to visitors to an educational, natural or recreational site, such as a museum, park or science centre. More specifically it is the communication of information about, or the explanation of, the nature, origin, and purpose of historical, natural, or cultural resources, objects, sites and phenomena using personal or non-personal methods.  Some international authorities in museology prefer the term mediation for the same concept, following usage in other European languages.

Heritage interpretation may be performed at dedicated interpretation centres or at museums, historic sites, parks, art galleries, nature centres, zoos, aquaria, botanical gardens, nature reserves and a host of other heritage sites. Its modalities can be extremely varied and may include guided walks, talks, drama, staffed stations, displays, signs, labels, artwork, brochures, interactives, audio-guides and audio-visual media. The process of developing a structured approach to interpreting these stories, messages and information is called interpretive planning. The thematic approach to heritage interpretation advocated by University of Idaho professor Sam Ham, the National Association for Interpretation, the US National Park Service, and others, is considered best practice.

Those who practice this form of interpretation may include rangers, guides, naturalists, actors (who may wear period dress and do reenactments), museum curators, natural and cultural interpretive specialists, interpretation officers, heritage communicators, docents, educators, visitor services staff, interpreters or a host of other titles. The interpretive process is often assisted by new technologies such as visualizing techniques.

Purpose 

The goal of interpretation is to improve and enrich the visitor experience by helping site visitors understand the significance of the place they are visiting, and connecting those meanings to visitors' own personal lives. By weaving compelling, thematic stories about environmental phenomena and historical events, interpreters aim to provoke visitors to learn and think about their experiences.
Effective interpretation enables the visitors to make associations between the information given and their previous perceptions. According to Moscardo interpretation can produce 'Mindful Visitors' who are carefully processing information and negotiating the meanings of the observed object or intangible element.

Interpretation is often used by landowning government agencies and NGOs to promote environmental stewardship of the lands they manage.

Definitions of heritage interpretation

"Tilden's principles" of interpretation 

In his 1957 book, "Interpreting Our Heritage", Freeman Tilden defined six principles of interpretation:

For the past 50 years, Tilden's principles have remained highly relevant to interpreters across the world. In 2002 Larry Beck and Ted Cable published "Interpretation for the 21st Century - Fifteen Guiding Principles for Interpreting Nature and Culture", which elaborated upon Tilden's original principles. In 2011, Beck and Cable released a new version of their principles in "The Gift of Interpretation".

Interpretation organizations

 Association for Heritage Interpretation, UK (external link)
 Association for Living History, Farm and Agricultural Museums, USA (external link)
Interpretation Latin América and the Caribbean (external link)
 Interpretation Australia (external link)
 Interpretation Canada (external link)
 Interpret Europe (external link)
 Interpret Scotland (external link)
 Interpretation Network New Zealand (external link)
 ICOMOS Charter for the Interpretation and Presentation of Cultural Heritage Sites, International (external link)
 ICOMOS International Committee on Interpretation and Presentation (external link)
 National Association for Interpretation, USA (external link)
 Swedish Centre for Heritage Interpretation (external link)

See also

 Blue plaque
 First-person interpretation
 Interpretation centre
 Interpretive planning
 Living history
 Natural Heritage Education
 Thematic interpretation
 Visitor center

References 

 Beck, L.; Cable, T. (1998). Interpretation for the 21st Century: Fifteen guiding principles for interpreting nature and culture. Sagamore Publishing, 
 Hadden, Robert Lee. "Reliving the Civil War: A reenactor's handbook". Mechanicsburg, PA: Stackpole Books, 1999.
 Ham, S. (1992). Environmental Interpretation: A Practical Guide for People with Big Ideas and Small Budgets. Fulcrum Publishing, 
 Ham, S. (2009). From Interpretation to protection—Is there a theoretical basis? Journal of Interpretation Research, 14(2), 49-57.
 Salazar, N. (2007). Towards a global culture of heritage interpretation? Evidence from Indonesia and Tanzania. Tourism Recreation Research, 32(3), 23–30.
 Salazar, N. (2012). Envisioning Eden: Mobilizing imaginaries in tourism and beyond. Oxford: Berghahn, .
 Silberman, N. (2006). "The ICOMOS Ename Charter Initiative: Rethinking the Role of Heritage Interpretation in the 21st Century." George Wright Forum
 Tilden, F. (1957). Interpreting our Heritage. University of North Carolina Press, North Carolina

Online resources 
 A Sense of Place - An interpretive planning handbook. James Carter
 Basic Interpretive Skills - A Course Manual. Thorsten Ludwig
 Definitions Project
 Distilling the Essence - New Zealand Department of Conservation Interpretation Handbook and Standard
 Heritage Destination Consulting Interpretive Resource Library
 Heritage Interpretation Centres. The hicira handbook* Museums Galleries Scotland Interpretation Guidance
 Scottish Natural Heritage Interpretation Guidance
 Tasmanian Thematic Interpretation Planning Manual
 The Interpret Scotland Journal - Back issues
 ShineNet.net, An on-line professional network for interpretation, environmental education, heritage education and non-formal education.

Hermeneutics
Cultural heritage
Museology
Communication
Environmental interpretation
Heritage interpretation